Wendy Starland is an American singer, songwriter and music producer from Los Angeles. Starland was honored by The Songwriters Hall of Fame; was named VH1's Best Emerging Artist; was featured on Moby's Grammy nominated album Last Night; and opened for Sheryl Crow and Jack White at the Michigan International Speedway. In addition, Starland discovered and developed thirteen time Grammy, two time Golden Globe, and Oscar winning icon Lady Gaga. Starland developed Lady Gaga's career during the recording of Lady Gaga's album The Fame, which received Billboard's Album of the Decade, having logged sixty-two of its record-setting one hundred eight total weeks at No. 1 on the Top Dance/Electronic Albums chart this decade.

Career 

Starland was named in the Beckhamhouse Book as one of the 'Great Female Singers' alongside Aretha Franklin, Billie Holiday, Etta James, and Natalie Cole. Starland's single, "Dancing with the Sea", was released on Universal alongside Norah Jones, Feist, and Edie Brickell. The song hit number eight on the music charts giving her the opportunity to tour Europe. Starland signed a major music publishing contract with BMG Rights Management. Starland was a featured performer at MI Fest, opening for Sheryl Crow and Jack White. Starland also performed at the Cannes Film Festival at Cinemoi Network's charity event benefiting Children Uniting Nations with producer and DJ Paul Oakenfold, Ashlee Simpson, and Evan Ross. Wendy Starland performed with Kii Arens and James Bourne for Linda Perry's Rock-N-Relief Concert. Both virtual and live performances took place at Dodger Stadium. In addition to Starland, the roster of talent also included legendary acts such the Foo Fighters, Sheryl Crow, deadmau5, Jewel,  Ziggy Marley, Carly Simon, Perry Farrell, Macy Gray, James Blunt, Gavin Rossdale, Juliette Lewis, Tracy Bonham, Aloe Blacc and others.

Starland was responsible for discovering thirteen time Grammy winner Lady Gaga, and landed her a deal with a multi-platinum producer for Beyoncé, Jessica Simpson, Whitney Houston, and Britney Spears, that resulted in Lady Gaga signing major label record and publishing contracts. Starland and Lady Gaga wrote songs together while she helped to develop her brand and marketing strategy.

Starland is a lead vocalist on Moby's album Last Night, which went to number two on the Billboard charts. She was also featured on Moby's follow up album, Last Night Remixed. Starland was featured on the Billy Ray Cyrus album, Thin Line. Starland has opened for Chris Shiflett of the Foo Fighters, Chris Cornell, Rachel Platten, Sean Paul, Gavin Degraw, Grandmaster Flash, Shawn Colvin, Vonda Shepard, Fishbone, The English Beat, Mike Posner, The Pointer Sisters, Karl Denson, The Romantics, Ronnie Dunn, Jonatha Brooke and Lucy Woodward. She also performed at the Toronto International Film Festival, at the premiere of Adrian Grenier's film Teenage Papparazzo in 2011.

Starland has written and recorded songs with or for Snoop Dogg, Ben Lee, The Wu Tang Clan, Capone of Island Def Jam's Capone-N-Noreaga, and Apl.de.ap of the Black Eyed Peas, and American Idol winner, Maddie Poppe.

Her music has been heard in hundreds of film and television shows, including MTV's The Hills, Jersey Shore, Spiker, The Rules, Weekend Getaway, and promos for two NBC primetime series, Las Vegas and Hawaii. Starland has licensed over 1one hundred songs to several networks, including MTV, Vh1, NBC, ABC, E!, CBS, and FOX. Her song "Reveal The Sunshine" was the theme song for the TV ad campaign for luxury cruise line, Cunard, a division of Carnival Cruise Lines. Starland performed, co-wrote and co-produced the theme song for the Carmen Steffens ad campaign featuring Victoria's Secret supermodel, Alessandra Ambrosio.

Starland co-wrote, performed and co-produced the theme song for the film, The Original. She composed the score and soundtrack to the television show, Stilettos, by the creators of True Detective. Additionally, Starland is writing and producing the score and soundtrack for the film A Love of Money, starring Samuel L. Jackson, Billy Bob Thornton, Jessica Biel and Eminem.

Starland co-wrote and produced sixteen songs for the video game Rock Band 3 as well as Ubisoft's video game Rocksmith alongside the Rolling Stones Aerosmith, and Red Hot Chili Peppers on Xbox and PlayStation 3. Starland is a Featured Artist on the mobile app SongArc where she exclusively pre-released her song "Raven", co-written and produced by Ivo Moring.

Starland produced and co-wrote the RapScallions hit song "Can You Feel It."  The song has been licensed to the NHL and NBA on FOX Sports and is also played by the LA Kings, NY Rangers, Colorado Avalanche, Indiana Pacers, San Diego Padres, Kansas City Chiefs, St. Louis Blues, NY Giants and Denver Broncos for in-game entertainment in their arenas, including Madison Square Garden and Staples Center. "Can You Feel It" has also been licensed by Carl's Jr, Harley-Davidson, and Mercedes-Benz.

Starland is the Founder and CEO of philanthropic record label and marketing platform, Give Back Entertainment. GBE has worldwide distribution through Universal/INgrooves. GBE partnered with clothing lines, Pink Pump and P2, to raise money and awareness for the Make-A-Wish Foundation by holding a fashion show in which two Make-A-Wish children walked the runway to fulfill their wishes. A percentage of funds from all of Starland's CDs sold at Pink Pump and P2 stores were donated to the Make-A-Wish Foundation.

Other Ventures

Modeling

Wendy Starland has been featured in major publications including Vogue, Elle (magazine), Harper's Bazaar, Marie Claire, Vanity Fair, New York Post, Los Angeles Times, Us Weekly, People, Billboard,  and Hollywood Reporter, amongst others. Starland has appeared on several magazine covers, including Image & Style Magazine, Style Cruze Magazine, Ellements Magazine, Imirage Magazine, CMN Magazine, Esmee Magazine, Surreal Magazine, Surreal Lifestyle Magazine, HP Magazine, Blowout Magazine, The Starz United Magazine(CEO/Founder Donnie Lee Farrow), and Eclair Magazine.

Wendy Starland was a runway model in New York Fashion Week for the haute couture clothing line, Sima Collezione,  where her image graced a billboard in New York City's most prestigious, Times Square. In addition to closing the show for New York Fashion Week, Wendy Starland walked the runway for both Paris Fashion Week and Milan Fashion Week. Wendy Starland was a featured runway model for Forbes Magazine's fashion show for International Women's Day in Abu Dhabi. Alongside Wendy Starland, Forbes also featured iconic supermodels, Tyra Banks and Paulina Porizkova on the runway. The event received over four billion impressions online and was attended by some of the world's most powerful and influential women  including Hillary Clinton, Tyra Banks, founder and CEO of Huda Beauty / Huda Kattan, singer Loren Gray, and Her Royal Highness Princess Lamia bint Majid Al Saud, just to name a few.

Starland is a print and runway model for designer Gordana Gehlhausen, star of the hit television series on Bravo (American TV network), Project Runway. Starland is featured in Gordana Gehlhausen's ad campaign for her new clothing line, and was featured on the cover of Ellements Magazine. She is also the face of Bvlgari designer's jewelry line, Anna e Alex where her music is offered as a download with purchase. Starland is a featured model for luxury skincare line BB Lifestyle, Seoulfull Skin Food, as well as organic herbal supplements DVN ALN and clothing line Boy Meets Girl.

Starland was the lead model featured in the ad campaign of the luxury clothing, jewelry, and fragrance lines for Morreale Paris, and was a swimsuit model for both the Misurare and Ananova LA campaigns. Starland is the face of  the luxury brands Atelieria, as well as Barollo. Barollo is featured in magazines such as Glamour and People worn by celebrities such as Angelina Jolie, Marisa Tomei, and Caitlyn Jenner.  Additionally, Wendy Starland was named among The Hottest New York Models of All Time.

Television

Starland was the only judge of musical talent on the French television series Les Anges. Starland was featured in the tenth season of Les Anges on TV network NRJ 12, reaching on average, between 500,000 and 700,000 viewers per episode. On the show, Starland chose to develop French celebrity, Sarah Van Elst, previously featured on Season 4 of The Voice. Starland and Van Elst appeared together on the hit TV show Extra with Mario Lopez. Starland was a guest Speaker at Masters Program at Berklee College of Music as well as a panelist on Power Women In Music at Musicians Institute.

Painting

A true renaissance woman, Wendy Starland was called A Modern Da Vinci by Welum Magazine. Wendy Starland has successfully delivered the highest standard of excellence in painting, drawing, sculpture, photography, silkscreen, lithography and music over the course of her celebrated career. Her passion to express complex ideas about societal norms and concepts through her figurative art is instantly compelling through a lush landscape of color and texture. This Ivy League educated Cornell graduate is now gracing magazine covers worldwide and is sought after by the world's most prestigious contemporary art collectors. NBC News states: Wendy Starland's painting style combines smooth detailed elements of photorealism with the lush, thick painting style reminiscent of the post-impressionist and expressionist artists. Her images have a classic and timeless feel to them.  In addition, Wendy Starland is a groundbreaking force – and this exhibit of her Haptagram NFT is a trailblazing moment in art history. Starland's oil paintings were featured at an event hosted by Forbes Magazine at blue chip gallery, Winn Slavin Fine Art, on Rodeo Drive in Beverly Hills, CA. Winn Slavin Fine Art Gallery represents Master artists such as Picasso and Salvador Dalí. Starland created a series of oil paintings on the subject matter of time that were inspired by photographs taken with Darwin World Media. With Wendy Starland's latest series in high demand by art collectors internationally, Wendy Starland has been named the Art World's New 'It Girl.'

Awards 

 Grammy Nominated for Moby's Album, Last Night, lead vocalist
 Honored by Songwriters Hall Of Fame, single "Dancing with the Sea"
 VH1 Award, Best Emerging Artist
 HOT 107 FM, voted "Best Song" 
 Tonos International Songwriting Competition, Best Song, "Stolen Love"
 Voted "Best Song" by listener's requests on KIX 92.1 FM, "The Finish Line"
 Independent Music Award, Best Song
 Brooklyn Arts Council, Best Song
 Voted "Top Indie Artist" by listener's requests on Boston's WNRC 97.5 FM
 METEOR Award Nomination for Blink

References

External links 

21st-century American singers
American women pop singers
American women singer-songwriters
Living people
Singers from New York City
Models from New York City
1981 births
American women rock singers
American pop rock singers
Singers from Los Angeles
American rock songwriters
21st-century American women singers
Lady Gaga
Singer-songwriters from California
Singer-songwriters from New York (state)